Rasbora vulgaris is a species of ray-finned fish in the genus Rasbora. It is a member of the R. paviana-subgroup, which comprises five species from Indochina and the Malay Peninsula (R. paviana, R. vulgaris, R. notura, R. hobelmani, and R. dorsinotata)

Description 
A maximum body length of 7.8 cm. However, there are unconfirmed reports of larger wild specimens up to 10 cm.

A slender-bodied species with females being much broader, with a base color of a brownish green to bluish white. The identifying feature of the species from others of its group is the lack of a black line covering the lateral line, a singular diamond black blotch at the base o the caudle peduncle, and a faded black marking near the end of each lobe of the caudal fin, near similar to the tail of R. trilineata.

Distribution 
It is found and is possibly endemic to the western coast of Peninsular Malaysia. However, a western Java population had been described.

Habitat 
It is an adaptable species being able to live in marshlands, main rivers, floodplains, lakes and even drainage systems, but it thrives the most in fast flowing, clear water forest streams with a sandy or rocky bottom. Fry and juveniles can often be caught around submerged vegetation.

References 

Fish of Thailand
Rasboras
Freshwater fish of Malaysia
Fish described in 1904
Taxa named by Georg Duncker